In Indic scripts, the daṇḍa (Sanskrit: दण्ड  "stick") is a punctuation mark. The glyph consists of a single vertical stroke.

Use 
The daṇḍa marks the end of a sentence or line, comparable to a full stop (period) as commonly used in the Latin alphabet, and is used together with Western punctuation in Hindi and Nepali.

The daṇḍa and double daṇḍa are the only punctuation used in Sanskrit texts. No distinct punctuation is used to mark questions or exclamations, which must be inferred from other aspects of the sentence. 

In metrical texts, a double daṇḍa is used to delimit verses, and a single daṇḍa to delimit a pada, line, or semi-verse. In prose, the double daṇḍa is used to mark the end of a paragraph, a story, or section.

Computer encoding 
The Devanagari character can be found at code point U+0964 in Unicode. The "double daṇḍa" is at U+0965. The Unicode standard recommends using this character also in other Indic scripts, like Bengali, Telugu, Oriya, and others. Encoding it separately for every Indic script was proposed, but as of 2020, this proposal has not been implemented.

Danda and similar characters are encoded separately for some scripts in which its appearance or use is significantly different from the Devangari one. These include forms with adornments, such as the Rgya Gram Shad.

ISCII encodes daṇḍa at 0xEA.

See also
Vertical bar

Footnotes

References

External links 
 
 

Devanagari
Grammar
Semiotics
Syntax
Punctuation